Aung Ko Oo is a Burmese name and may refer to:
Aung Ko Oo (born 1988), Burmese architect, photographer and musician
Aung Ko Win, Burmese businessman 
Aung Ko (born 1948), Burmese politician